G. Anil Kumar (Bangalore, India) is noted Indian journalist, columnist and writer. He is Editor of Karmaveera, a 100-year-old Kannada weekly (founded in 1921). Earlier he was associate editor of Samyukta Karnataka, the oldest Kannada daily. He is also founder-editor of its widely acclaimed Saturday supplement for children called, "Kindari Jogi".

He has contributed many articles to Indian and foreign newspapers, magazines and websites. Trained in computer engineering, G Anil Kumar was with the booming software industry in 1990s. Later he changed his field of work to form a think tank with N. S. Rajaram in Bangalore. Before joining Samyukta Karnataka, he was associated with The Times of India, Kannada daily Usha Kirana and many other papers and magazines. He was also a founder director of a policy research organization.

Kindari Jogi 

G. Anil Kumar has created ripples in Kannada journalism by creating a unique educational magazine for school going children called 'Kindari Jogi', a Kannada name for famous 'Pied Piper'. 

It was felt that children were not getting the required attention of the mainstream media, especially in Indian languages. In this era of celebrity-centric journalism, young students are not getting anything useful from the media. So, in April 2007 he started a special 8-page, all-color, attractive weekly educational supplement for the young readers.
 
From the day one, this Saturday supplement of Samyukta Karnataka has become a great hit beyond everybody's expectations. Unique content, catering to the specific needs of the students (in the age group of 9–16 years) with international quality and good design & printing are the hallmark of 'Kindari Jogi'.

Thousands of schools have welcomed it with great enthusiasm. They are offering 'Kindari Jogi' to their students as a supplementary material to their regular textbooks. A simple, dedicated, concerned and, of course, tailor-made approach to kids' infotainment needs has now created a great revolution in Karnataka.

References

External links 
G Anil Kumar's articles and profile
Samyukta Karnataka Home Page and E-paper
Karmaveera Weekly

Journalists from Karnataka
1972 births
Living people
Writers from Bangalore